Hossein Faraki (born 22 March 1957) is a retired Iranian football player and a coach.

Personal life
He was born on 22 March 1957 in Tehran, Iran. He began playing football with PAS Tehran in 1976.

Faraki has a son named Hessam.

Playing career

Club career
He spent most of his career playing for Pas Tehran. Faraki won with Pas the Iranian Takht Jamshid in 1977 and 1978; he was also the top goal scorer of the Iranian league in 1978/79, when the league was left incomplete due to political unrest in Iran at the time.

Faraki also played for Al-Shaab of the UAE at the time when Heshmat Mohajerani became head coach of the club.

International career
He played for the Iran national football team and participated at the 1978 FIFA World Cup, where he played all three matches. He also reached the third place in the 1980 Asian Cup in Kuwait.

Managerial career
Faraki began his coaching career as an assistant coach at Pas Tehran, the club that he played for in 1976 to 1992. He worked with many coaches like Ebrahim Ghasempour, Firouz Karimi and Bijan Zolfagharnasab. After six years as assistant coach, he was named as caretaker manager of the team after the resignation of Ghasempour in 2002. He led the team until the end of the 1999–00 season which the club ended in 7th place. He left the team after Farhad Kazemi becomes the team's head coach.

During Branko Ivankovic's time as Team Melli manager, Faraki was the assistant manager. He was also the head coach of the Iran national under-23 football team from 2003 till 2006. He was manager of Kaveh Tehran which led the club to promotion to the Azadegan League. He was appointed as head coach of Naft Tehran on 1 July 2010 and secured the team from relegation in his first season at the club. At the second season, he led the club to the 5th place, which was their best league end until 2014. He not renewed his contract with the team and signed a two years contract with Foolad on 5 June 2012. He led Foolad to the AFC Champions League for the second time since 2006 after they finished 4th in 2012–13. In 2013–14 season, Faraki's side won the league, finishing the season with 57 points, two more from runners-up Persepolis. He resigned as Foolad's manager at the end of the season because he needs an imminent knee operation.

On 9 September 2014, Faraki was named as new manager of Sepahan with signing a two-year contract, replaced Zlatko Kranjčar who resigned day before. He led Sepahan to the league title in his first season at the club. On 30 May 2015, he extended his contract with Sepahan until 2018. However, he was sacked by the club on 1 November 2015 after a run of unsuccessful results.

Statistics

International goals

Coaching career statistics

Honours

As a player
Pas
Iranian Football League (3): 1976–77, 1977–78, 1991–92

As a manager
Kaveh 
Second Division (1): 2008–09

Foolad
Iran Pro League (1): 2013–14

Sepahan
Iran Pro League (1): 2014–15

Individual
Iranian Football League top goalscorer (1): 1978–79
Iran Football Federation Award coach of the season (3): 2013–14, 2014–15
Iran Pro League best manager (2): 2013–14, 2014–15
Iranian Manager of the Year (2): 2014, 2015

References

External links

 Hossain Faraki at TeamMelli.com

1957 births
Living people
1978 FIFA World Cup players
1980 AFC Asian Cup players
Al-Shaab CSC players
Association football forwards
Iran international footballers
Iranian expatriate footballers
Iranian football managers
Iranian footballers
Pas players
UAE Pro League players
Sportspeople from Tehran
Persian Gulf Pro League managers
20th-century Iranian people
Foolad F.C. managers
Sepahan S.C. managers
Paykan F.C. managers